Laurent Carl Siebenmann (the first name is sometimes spelled Laurence or Larry) (born 1939) is a Canadian mathematician based at the Université de Paris-Sud at Orsay, France.

After working for several years as a Professor at Orsay he became a Directeur de Recherches at the Centre national de la recherche scientifique in 1976. He is a topologist who works on manifolds and who co-discovered the Kirby–Siebenmann class.

Education
Siebenmann's undergraduate studies were at the University of Toronto. He received a Ph.D. from Princeton University under the supervision of John Milnor in 1965 with the dissertation The obstruction to finding a boundary for an open manifold of dimension greater than five. His doctoral students at Orsay included Francis Bonahon and Albert Fathi.

Recognition
In 1985 he was awarded the Jeffery–Williams Prize by the Canadian Mathematical Society. In 2012 he became a fellow of the American Mathematical Society.

Selected publications

References

External links
Kirby and the promised land of topological manifolds: memories and memorable arguments; a talk by Siebenmann
Photos at Oberwolfach
Home page

1939 births
Living people
Topologists
Princeton University alumni
University of Toronto alumni
Academic staff of Paris-Sud University
Fellows of the American Mathematical Society
Canadian mathematicians
Scientists from Toronto
20th-century French mathematicians